Münci Kalayoğlu is a doctor from Turkey. He was born in Ankara in 1940.

In 1963 he graduated from Ankara Üniversitesi Tıp Fakültesi, after which he studied at Haccettepe Üniversitesi Tıp Fakültesi. He became an intern at the New York Mount Sinai Medical School and Pittsburg Child Hospital. He is the founder and president of the Department of Liver Transplantation at the University of Wisconsin. He has made more than 1500 liver transplants throughout his career.

He has 185 published works, including 22 articles in international medical magazines. Since 2006 he has been head of a private hospital.

References

External links
 

Turkish transplant surgeons
Living people
Honorary members of the Turkish Academy of Sciences
Year of birth missing (living people)